Appearances by American actress Lucille Ball (August 6, 1911 – April 26, 1989).

Filmography
Lucille Ball appeared in movies and on television from 1927 until 1986.

Feature films

Short subjects
Selected list

 Perfectly Mismated (1934)
 Three Little Pigskins (1934)
 His Old Flame (1935)
 A Night at the Biltmore Bowl (1935)
 Foolish Hearts (1935)
 Dummy Ache (1936)
 Swing It (1936)
 So and Sew (1936)
 One Live Ghost (1936)
 Screen Snapshots Series 18, No. 1 (1938)
 Meet the Stars #6: Stars at Play (1941)
 All About People (1967)

Radio and television work
Selected list

 The Campbell Playhouse, "Dinner at Eight" (1940)
 The Orson Welles Show (1941)
 The Orson Welles Almanac (1944) (two guest appearances)
 Suspense (1944 - 1945) 

 The Lux Radio Theatre (1946, 1947, 1949  & 1950)  
 My Favorite Husband (radio) 1948–1951
 The Ed Wynn Show (1949)
 I Love Lucy (1951– 1957)
 The Lucy–Desi Comedy Hour (1957 – 1960)
 The Phil Silvers Show - (uncredited) (1959)
 Make Room For Daddy (1959) 
 The Ann Sothern Show (1959) 
 Sunday Showcase (1959) 
 The Good Years (CBS TV Special) (1976)
 The Danny Kaye Show with Lucille Ball (1962)
 The Lucy Show (1962 – 1968)
 The Bob Hope Specials (1962)
 The Greatest Show on Earth (1963)
 Mr. and Mrs. (1964)
 Lucy in London (1966)
 Carol + 2 (1967)
 The Carol Burnett Show (1967–1971)
 Here's Lucy (1968 – 1974)
 The Flip Wilson Show (1971) (guest appearance)
 Make Room For Granddaddy (1971) (guest appearance)
 Happy Anniversary and Goodbye (1974)
 Lucy Gets Lucky (1975)
 A Lucille Ball Special Starring Lucille Ball and Jackie Gleason (1975)
 What Now, Catherine Curtis? (1976)
 The Practice (1976) 
 CBS Salutes Lucy: The First 25 Years (1976)
 Lucy Calls the President (1977)
 Lucy Comes to Nashville (1978)
 Lucy Moves to NBC (1980)
 Three's Company (1982)
 Stone Pillow (1985)
 Life with Lucy (1986)
 Tina (2021) (archival footage)

Stage

References

Bibliography

Further reading
 Lucy at the Movies: The Complete Films of Lucille Ball by Cindy De La Hoz (Running Press, 2007)
 Lucille Ball FAQ: Everything Left to Know About America's Favorite Redhead by James Sheridan and Barry Monush (2011)

External links
 

Actress filmographies
American filmographies